Sharif Abd Allah Pasha ibn Muhammad ( al-Sharīf ‘Abd Allāh Bāshā ibn Muḥammad;  Şerif Abdullah Paşa bin Muhammed; d. 1877) was a sharif of the Awn clan who served as Emir and Sharif of Mecca from 1858 to 1877.

References

Year of birth missing
1877 deaths
Dhawu Awn
Sharifs of Mecca
19th-century Arabs